Hanford Elementary School District is a public school district in Kings County, California, United States.

External links
 

School districts in Kings County, California